Singham is a 2019 Indian Punjabi-language action film written by Dheeraj Rattan and directed by Navaniat Singh. Co-produced by T-Series, Ajay Devgn Films and Panorama Studios, it stars Parmish Verma, Kartar Cheema and Sonam Bajwa, along with Sardar Sohi, Rupinder Rupi, Anita Devgn, and Hardeep Gill in supporting roles. It is an official remake of 2010 Tamil film Singam. The film chronicles the story of righteous cop Dilsher Singh, who fights against drug peddlers in his village Singham Khurd.

The film was release worldwide on 9 August 2019.

Plot 

After taking charge as the DSP of Singham Khurd, Dilsher Sekhon sets out to end the drug addiction among the youth of Punjab. This sets him against Bhuller, a vicious business tycoon with connections in high places.

Cast 
 Parmish Verma as DSP Dilsher Sekhon
 Kartar Cheema as Bhullar
 Sonam Bajwa as Nikki
 Sardar Sohi as Minister
 Rupinder Rupi as Dilsher's Mother
 Hardeep Gill as Male Police Officer
 Anita Devgan as Lady Police Officer
 Priyanka Arya as Pinky

Soundtrack 
The music was composed by Desi Crew while the lyrics were penned by Raj Ranjodh, Laddi Chahal, and Balvir Boparai. The album features vocals from Shipra Goyal, Kulwinder Dhillon, and Goldy Desi Crew. The song "Kalli Kitte Mil", sung by Dhillon, with music originally given by Sukhpal Sukh and lyrics penned by Balvir Boparai, was recreated by Desi Crew.

Release 
The film was released theatrically on 9 August 2019.

References

External links 
 
 Singham Punjabi Movie at Hindi Mein

Punjabi remakes of Hindi films
Punjabi remakes of Tamil films
Fictional portrayals of the Punjab Police (India)
T-Series (company) films
Indian action films
2019 masala films
Cop Universe
2019 action films
Punjabi-language Indian films
2010s Punjabi-language films